Twitches may refer to:
 Twitches (novel series), a 2000s American children's fantasy novel series by H. B. Gilmour and Randi Reisfeld
 Twitches (film), the 2005 Disney Channel Original Movie
 Twitches Too, the 2007 sequel (also a Disney Channel Original Movie)
 Fasciculations, muscle twitches